Alcyonidium diaphanum, commonly called the sea-chervil (after the herb which it resembles), is a species of bryozoan found in the North Atlantic. It can cause a rash known as "Dogger Bank itch" when handled for prolonged periods.

External links
http://www.habitas.org.uk/marinelife/species.asp?item=Y1370 Article with image

Ctenostomatida